Alwarthirunagiri is a panchayat town in Thoothukudi district  in the state of Tamil Nadu, India.
It is next to Srivaikuntam on the Tirunelveli - Tiruchendur Highway, Tamil Nadu, southern India. It's about 31 km from Tirunelveli and 29 km from Tiruchendur, on the banks of the river Tamirabarani. Alwarthirunagiri is the birthplace of alwar saint Nammalvar. The temple is classified as a "Divya Desam", the 108 temples of Sri Narayana revered by the 12 poet saints, or Alwars.

Demographics
 India census, Alwarthirunagiri had a population of 9.289. Males constitute 49% of the population and females 51%. Alwarthirunagiri has an average literacy rate of 82%, higher than the national average of 74.4%;

 India census, Alwarthirunagiri had a population of 8876. Males constitute 48% of the population and females 52%. Alwarthirunagiri has an average literacy rate of 78%, higher than the national average of 59.5%; with 50% of the males and 50% of females literate. 11% of the population is under 6 years of age.

Nammalvar
Alwarthirunagiri is the birthplace of Nammalvar, one of the 12 Alvars of Vaishnavism. It is also one of the Nava Tirupathis of South Tamil Nadu. Known to be a Guru Kshethram, the presiding deity is Vishnu. As an infant, Nammazhwar crawled and sat in yogasana in a hole of a tamarind tree.

Manavala Mamunigal
Alwarthirunagiri is also the birthplace of Manavala Mamunigal, a major proponent of the Sri Vaishnavism tradition in the 15th century in Tamilnadu.

See also
 Alwarthirunagiri Temple
 Thirukkoloor

References

External links 
 Alwartirunagari Info - Hindubooks.org
 Alwarthirunagari Railway Station

Cities and towns in Thoothukudi district